The Lypya is a river in Perm Krai, Russia, a right tributary of the Vishera, which in turn is a tributary of the Kama. It starts in the extreme north of the krai, near the border with the Komi Republic, and flows into the Vishera  from the larger river's mouth.

References 

Rivers of Perm Krai